Pembrokeshire Action To Combat Hardship (PATCH), formerly Milford Action To Combat Hardship (MATCH), is a British non-profit Christian faith based charitable organisation, founded in June 2008, that aims to help people who are in a financial crisis. They are based in Milford Haven, Pembrokeshire and have other 'bases' in Pembroke Dock, Saundersfoot and Haverfordwest.

It is based on a similar charity in Southampton, SCRATCH.

Aim
PATCH's main aim is to provide short term relief to people who find themselves in a financial crisis, regardless of circumstances. They work on a referral only bases, so only people who are genuinely in need can access their services.

As the name suggests, they currently only operate in the Pembrokeshire area. Although future expansion can not be ruled out based on their past (i.e. Going from just Milford Haven to Pembrokeshire as a whole).

Projects

Basics Banks
PATCH was first started as a 'basics bank' providing non-perishable food along with clothing and household items. The basics bank works on a referral only basis from outside agencies which give vouchers valid for use in the various PATCH basics banks. There are currently three basics banks in Pembrokeshire in Milford Haven, Monkton and Haverfordwest. However, food parcels are held in churches and other locations around the county in order to enable access to the services for those without transport.

Fill Your Boots
In order to allow people access to the service they offer that may not have the ability to cook or heat food given to them through the basics bank. PATCH offers a voucher scheme whereby people can donate money via PATCH to people who will be given vouchers to be used in local cafes and other food outlets. These will then be redeemed by the outlet, through PATCH, for the full cash price.

Christmas Toy Appeal
A PATCH toy appeal has happened annually since 2010, whereby toys and other presents are donated to PATCH who then distribute them to families with children who are referred via outside agencies. The presents are then delivered, during school times, so the children are unaware. In 2013 over 500 children, in over 180 families were given 4-5 'good quality' gifts for each child.

Food Co-Op
In April 2014 PATCH launched a food co-op, buying fresh food and selling it at cost price to the public. Unlike its other services, this is not on a referral-only basis and is open to the public to use.

Support
PATCH receives support from numerous local business. The main contributors to the charity include South Hook LNG terminal, NatWest Milford Haven Branch and the Tesco Milford Haven and Pembroke Dock Stores. As well as support from the local media.

Stephen Crabb, the MP Preseli Pembrokeshire, is also a supporter of the charity and officially opened their Haverfordwest branch. Simon Hart, MP for Carmarthen West and South Pembrokeshire is also a supporter of the charity.

In 2014 the charity was named Milford Haven Port Authority/Port of Milford Haven charity of the year and received financial support and other services through the port authority.

In media 
Their first major media appearance was on the BBC documentary "The Mount: A Welsh Estate" where they visited the Milford Haven branch. In late 2011 they appeared on Channel 5 news due to a volunteer, Rosalyn Wild, being a finalist in "Britain's Kindest Kid".

In December 2012 PATCH was also a featured in a Christmas edition of the BBC show Songs of Praise.

Official Visits
Along with the local MP's and AM's, PATCH has also had several official visits from members both the cabinet and shadow cabinet from both the Welsh and UK Governments.

In January 2014 the charity visited by Shadow Secretary of State for Wales Owen Smith who said he was 'astonished' by the degree of poverty in Wales.

In the same month it was visited by Jeff Cuthbert the Welsh government minister for Communities and Tackling Poverty in order to see the impact of its support from the Welsh Government's Communities 2.0 programme.

In March 2018, Labour MP Emily Thornberry visited the charity, as part of her visit to the local area.

Awards

See also
 Charitable organization
 Monkton, Pembroke 
 Religion in the United Kingdom

References

External links 
 

Charities based in Wales
Christian charities based in the United Kingdom
Milford Haven
Pembrokeshire